The 2018 Davao Occidental Tigers season is the 1st season of the franchise in the Maharlika Pilipinas Basketball League (MPBL).

Key dates
 June 12, 2018: Regular Season Begins.

Current roster

Datu Cup

Standings

Game log

|- style="background:#bfb;"
| 1
| June 14
| Imus
| W 75–71
| Billy Robles (15)
| Mark Yee (12)
| Calo, Terso (5)
| Alonte Sports Arena
| 1–0
|- style="background:#bfb;"
| 2
| June 26
| Quezon City
| W 90–78
| Calo, Najorda (21)
| Billy Robles (10)
| Billy Robles (6)
| Pasig Sports Center
| 2–0

|- style="background:#fcc;"
| 3
| July 6
| Bataan
| L 88–91
| Emanuel Calo (25)
| Raymundo, Yee (8)
| Joseph Laslee Terso (7)
| Navotas Sports Complex
| 2–1
|- style="background:#fcc;"
| 4
| July 19
| Makati
| L 77–79
| Billy Robles (19)
| Robles, Terso (7)
| Billy Robles (5)
| Alonte Sports Arena
| 2–2

|- style="background:#fcc;"
| 5
| August 1
| Bulacan
| L 85–88
| 
| 
| 
| Filoil Flying V Centre
| 2–3
|- style="background:#bfb;"
| 6
| August 14
| Cebu
| W 71–64
| 
| 
| 
| 
| 3–3
|- style="background:#bfb;"
| 7
| August 25
| Pampanga
| W 82–77
| 
| 
| 
| 
| 4–3
|- style="background:#bfb;"
| 8
| August 30
| Valenzuela
| W 92–85
| 
| 
| 
| USEP Gymnasium & Cultural Center
| 5–3

|- style="background:#bfb;"
| 9
| September 19
| Pasay
| W 68–61
| 
| 
| 
| Cuneta Astrodome
| 6–3
|- style="background:#bfb;"
| 10
| September 29
| Caloocan
| W 82–68
| Mark Yee (29)
| Mark Yee (11)
| Bonbon Custodio (12)
| Caloocan Sports Complex
| 7–3

|- style="background:#bfb;"
| 11
| October 13
| Laguna
| W 72–66
| 
| 
| 
| 
| 8–3
|- style="background:#bfb;"
| 12
| October 20
| Mandaluyong
| W 86–63
| 
| 
| 
| Rizal Memorial College Gymnasium
| 9–3

|- style="background:#bfb;"
| 13
| November 10
| Navotas
| W 72–59
| 
| 
| 
| Cuneta Astrodome
| 10–3
|- style="background:#bfb;"
| 14
| November 20
| Zamboanga
| W 93–68
| 
| 
| 
| Valenzuela Astrodome
| 11–3
|- style="background:#bfb;"
| 15
| November 24
| Basilan
| W 86–61
| 
| 
| 
| Lamitan Capitol Gymnasium
| 12–3

|- style="background:#bfb;"
| 16
| December
| Pasig
| W 88–82
| 
| 
| 
| 
| 13–3
|- style="background:#bfb;"
| 17
| December
| Bacoor
| W 69–50
| 
| 
| 
| Strike Gymnasium
| 14–3
|- style="background:#bfb;"
| 18
| December 18
| San Juan
| W 87–75
| 
| 
| 
| Rizal Memorial College Gymnasium
| 15–3

|- style="background:#fcc;"
| 19
| January 9
| GenSan
| L 83–84
| 
| 
| 
| Valenzuela Astrodome
| 15–4
|- style="background:#bfb;"
| 20
| January 19
| Marikina
| W 80–68
| 
| 
| 
| Marist School Gym
| 16–4
|- style="background:#bfb;"
| 21
| January 29
| Parañaque
| W 92–82
| 
| 
| 
| Valenzuela Astrodome
| 17–4

|- style="background:#bfb;"
| 22
| February 9
| Batangas
| W 71–70
| 
| 
| 
| Batangas City Coliseum
| 18–4
|- style="background:#bfb;"
| 23
| February 21
| Rizal
| W 84–74
| 
| 
| 
| Muntinlupa Sports Complex
| 19–4
|- style="background:#fcc;"
| 24
| February 26
| Manila
| L 88–89
| 
| 
| 
| San Andres Sports Complex
| 19–5

|- style="background:#bfb;"
| 25
| March 6
| Muntinlupa
| W 88–82
| 
| 
| 
| Muntinlupa Sports Complex
| 20–5

Playoffs

Bracket

References

Davao Occidental Tigers
Davao Occidental Tigers Season, 2018